Bhaiyya Bhaiyya (Theatrical name: Bhayya Bhayya) is a 2014 Malayalam comedy film directed by Johny Antony and scripted by Benny P. Nayarambalam starring Kunchacko Boban and Biju Menon in lead roles. The film also features Nisha Agarwal (in her debut Malayalam film), Vinutha Lal, Innocent, Suraj Venjarammood, Salim Kumar and Vijayaraghavan in other important roles. It features music by Vidyasagar and cinematography by Vinod Illampally and was largely shot at Mostly at Erayil Kadavu Kottayam, Tamil Nadu and Kolkata. Produced by Laisamma Pottoore under Nobel Andre Production, Bhaiyya Bhaiyya released on 5 September 2014.

Plot
The film begins with the mischievous childhood of Babumon and Baburam Chatterji. Then it progresses to their mischievous adulthood. They run into some troubles with Monayi and Varki, who are the brother and father of Angel, Babu's love interest, and their right hand Manikandan. When a Bengali worker falls prey to a trap laid by Manikandan to kill Babu, it turns out to be a life changer. While taking the body back to Kolkata, Babu and Angel elope in the ambulance to register their marriage there. Chaterji takes up the driving, and Shanthi who is Babulal's love interest is also there and Soman to see Bengal. The troubles they land in and how they resolve it to successfully lead a married life forms the rest of the film.

Cast 

 Kunchacko Boban as Babumon
 Biju Menon as Babulal Chatterji / Bengali Babu
 Nisha Agarwal as Angel
 Vinutha Lal as Shanthi
 Innocent as Kochuveettil Chacko
 Suraj Venjarammood as Soman
 Vijayaraghavan as Vedipparambil Varkey
 Shammi Thilakan as Vedipparambil Monayi
 Salim Kumar as Korah
 Sudheer as Manikandan
 Sadiq as Police Officer
 Jacob Gregory as thief
 Jayasankar Karimuttam as thief
 Ambika Mohan as Chacko's wife & Babumon's mother
 Thesni Khan as Vasanthi
 Seema G. Nair as Police Officer's wife
 Jaise Jose as Ramalingam
 Makarand Deshpande as Maoist leader
 Krishna Shankar as Jayakrishnan Namboothiri
 Divya Prabha as Korah's daughter

Critical reception
The Times of India gave the film 3 stars out of 5 and wrote, "all in all, the story falls into place at the end, despite the initial glitches".
Sify wrote, "The makers of Bhaiyya Bhaiyya have just mixed melodrama, crass comedy, song n dance routines and some action sequences, without a proper recipe. Just like what happens in cooking, they end up making a tasteless dish". Rediff gave the film 2 stars out of 5 and wrote, "Bhaiyya Bhaiyya does provide a few chuckles, but nothing substantial". Nowrunning.com gave it a score of 1.8 out of 5 and wrote, "Sporadically bringing out a laughter or two, this is a film that very rarely engages us emotionally and which fundamentally falls apart at the seams". Indiaglitz.com gave it 6 out of 10 and wrote, "Evenly paced and filled with comedies, this light hearted film entertains in parts. Had it been directed with a little more care, ‘Bhaiya Bhaya’ could have worked relatively well".

Soundtrack

References

2014 films
2010s Malayalam-language films
Films shot in Kolkata
Films scored by Vidyasagar
Films directed by Johny Antony